Robert W. Singer (born October 29, 1947) is an American Republican Party politician, who has been serving in the New Jersey State Senate since 1993, where he represents the 30th Legislative District.  He was the Mayor of Lakewood Township, New Jersey in 2009. He serves in the Senate as the Deputy Republican Leader (since 2018) and as the ranking member of the Health Committee. He is the second-most senior senator behind Richard Codey.

Personal life
Singer was born in New York City on October 29, 1947. He grew up in New York attending public schools there. From 1966 to 1972, he served in the U.S. Coast Guard Reserves. He married the former Caryl Lynn Russo and has four children. He is a resident of Lakewood Township.

Robert Singer is Vice President of Corporate Relations, Community/Kimball Medical Center.

Political career
Before entering New Jersey's Senate, Singer served in the lower house of the New Jersey Legislature, the General Assembly for two stints, once from 1986 to 1990 serving the Ocean County-based 10th district, and again from 1992 through 1993 in the 30th district which now stretched from Burlington County through Monmouth and Ocean counties. He sought re-election to his Assembly seat in 1989 but was defeated by incumbent Democrat John Paul Doyle and former Democratic Assemblywoman Marlene Lynch Ford (the latter of whom Singer defeated in the 1985 and 1987 elections). In The Assembly, Singer was the majority whip from 1992 to 1993. Senator Singer had served on the Lakewood Township Committee since 1981, and was its mayor in 1983, from 1985 to 1986, 1994, and again in 2009 until retiring in 2010. He has been on the Monmouth-Ocean Development Council board of directors since 2001 and from 1996 to 1999 and the Lakewood Municipal Utility Authority since 1999 as chair. He has served since 1999 on the Ocean County Board of Health as its vice chair. Singer serves on the board of trustees of Georgian Court University in Lakewood and is a member of the board of directors of the Monmouth-Ocean Development Council.

Incumbent 30th district State Senator John E. Dimon announced that he would not seek re-election in 1993 due to poor health. Singer ran in the primary unopposed and became the Republican nominee for the November general election. Singer was selected by Republican committee members of the district to serve the unexpired Senate term of the late John E. Dimon and was sworn into office on October 14, 1993. He had simultaneously held a seat in the New Jersey Senate and as Mayor until 2010 when he chose to not seek re-election to the Lakewood Township Committee.  Singer had been a member of the Township Committee for nearly thirty years.  Prior to retiring from the Lakewood Township Committee, dual office holding was allowed under a grandfather clause in the state law enacted by the New Jersey Legislature and signed into law by Governor of New Jersey Jon Corzine in September 2007 that prevents dual-office-holding but allows those who had held both positions as of February 1, 2008, to retain both posts.

In the Senate, Singer served as the Co-Republican Majority Leader from 2002 to 2003 and as the Assistant Majority Leader from 1997 to 2001. Singer serves on the Legislative Services Commission, the Commerce Committee and the Health, Human Services and Senior Citizens Committee. Singer currently serves on the New Jersey Commission on Aging, the New Jersey Commission on Science and Technology and the New Jersey Asian American Commission. Singer has been the sponsor of various economic development measures, including bills to assist biotechnology and computer software firms, and to authorize the creation of Urban Enterprise Zones in the district.

Committees 
Committee assignments for the current session are:
Commerce
Health, Human Services and Senior Citizens
Legislative Oversight

District 30
Each of the 40 districts in the New Jersey Legislature has one representative in the New Jersey Senate and two members in the New Jersey General Assembly. The representatives from the 30th District for the 2022—23 Legislative Session are:
Senator Robert Singer
Assemblyman Sean T. Kean
Assemblyman Ned Thomson

Election history

References

External links
Senator Robert Singer's Official Site
Senator Singer's legislative web page, New Jersey Legislature
New Jersey Legislature financial disclosure forms
2011 2010 2009 2008 2007 2006 2005 2004

1947 births
Living people
Mayors of places in New Jersey
Politicians from Ocean County, New Jersey
Republican Party New Jersey state senators
Republican Party members of the New Jersey General Assembly
People from Lakewood Township, New Jersey
United States Coast Guard enlisted
United States Coast Guard reservists
21st-century American politicians